Ardnurcher is a civil parish in County Westmeath, Ireland.

Ardnurcher is one of 8 civil parishes in the barony of Moycashel in the Province of Leinster. It is contiguous with the remainder of the Ardnurcher civil parish, which is in County Offaly.

Ardnurcher civil parish, County Westmeath comprises 40 townlands: Ardballymore, Ardnurcher, Ballard, Ballinlaban, Ballyhattan, Ballynamullen, Brackagh Castle, Bunanagh, Cappaduff, Cloghanaskaw, Clongowly, Cloonymurrikin, Coolalough, Coolfin, Corgarve, Correagh, Creeve, Donore Demesne, Gawny, Gneevekeel, Kilbeg, Kilgaroan, Killard, Killeagh, Killeenycallaghan, Kilnagalliagh, Kilnalug, Kilpatrick, Lismoyny, Lissavra Big, Lissavra Little, Monaduff, Moycashel, Skeheen (Evans), Skeheen (Nagle), Spittaltown, Streamstown, Syonan, Teermore and Templemacateer.

The neighbouring civil parishes are: Conry and Killare (both barony of Rathconrath) to the north, Castletownkindalen and 
Kilbeggan to the east, Durrow (County Westmeath) and Durrow  (County Offaly) to the south and Ardnurcher or Horseleap, Kilbride, Kilcumreragh (all County Offaly) and Kilcumreragh to the west.

References

External links
Ardnurcher civil parish at the IreAtlas Townland Data Base
Ardnurcher civil parish at townlands.ie
Ardnurcher civil parish at The Placenames Database of Ireland

Civil parishes of County Westmeath